The 2019 FFA Cup was the sixth season of the FFA Cup, the main national soccer knockout cup competition in Australia. 32 teams contested the competition proper (from the round of 32), including 10 of the 11 A-League teams (with Western United not competing in their inaugural season) and 21 Football Federation Australia (FFA) member federation teams determined through individual state qualifying rounds, as well as the reigning National Premier Leagues Champion (Campbelltown City from South Australia).

Round and dates

Teams 
A total of 32 teams participated in the 2019 FFA Cup competition proper, ten of which are from the A-League, one the 2018 National Premier Leagues Champion (Campbelltown City), and the remaining 21 teams from FFA member federations, as determined by the qualifying rounds. The two new expansion A-League clubs – Western United and Macarthur FC – were deemed ineligible for the competition this year.

A-League clubs represent the highest level in the Australian league system, whereas member federation clubs come from Level 2 and below. The current season tier of member federation clubs is shown in parentheses.

Prize fund
The prize fund was unchanged from the previous three years' events.

Preliminary rounds

FFA member federations teams compete in various state-based preliminary rounds to win one of 21 places in the competition proper (round of 32). All Australian clubs were eligible to enter the qualifying process through their respective FFA member federation, however only one team per club is permitted entry in the competition. The preliminary rounds operate within a consistent national structure whereby club entry into the competition is staggered in each state/territory, ultimately leading to round 7 with the winning clubs from that round gaining direct entry into the round of 32. The format for Queensland was restructured in 2019, whereby the Central & Northern Queensland region competes for one place, and South East Queensland competes for three places.

The first matches of the preliminary rounds began in February 2019, and the final matches of the preliminary rounds scheduled was completed in June 2019.

Bracket

Round of 32
The Round of 32 draw took place on 26 June 2019, with match information confirmed on 28 June 2019.

The lowest ranked side that qualified for this round were Coomera Colts. They were the only level 4 team left in the competition.

All times listed below are at AEST

Round of 16
The Round of 16 draw took place on 7 August and match information was confirmed on 9 August.

The lowest ranked side that qualified for this round were Moreland Zebras. They were the only level 3 team left in the competition.

All times listed below are at AEST

Quarter-finals
The quarter-finals draw took place on 28 August, with match details announced the following day.

The lowest ranked club that qualified for this round were Moreland Zebras. They were the only level 3 team left in the competition.

All times listed below are at AEST

Semi-finals
The semi-finals draw took place on 18 September, with match details confirmed the following day.

The lowest ranked side that qualified for this round were the Brisbane Strikers. They were the only level 2 team remaining in the competition.

All times listed below are at AEST

Final

Individual honours
The recipient of the Michael Cockerill Medal to recognise the tournament's standout National Premier Leagues performer was Fraser Hills from Brisbane Strikers FC. 
Al Hassan Toure from Adelaide United won the Mark Viduka Medal for the player of the match in the final.

Top goalscorers

Broadcasting rights
The live television rights for the competition were held by the subscription network Fox Sports. From the round of 32 onwards all matches were broadcast online on the My Football Live app. Fox Sports also broadcast the following 10 games live:

References

External links
 Official website

Australia
2019 in Australian soccer
Australia Cup seasons